Chelsea Alden is an American actress, known for her roles in 13 Reasons Why, American Horror Story: Roanoke, The Tale, and Unfriended: Dark Web. Alden also appeared in an episode of Veep.

Filmography

Film

Television

References

External links
 

1988 births
Living people
American television actresses
21st-century American actresses